The Mk 1 grenade (sometimes spelled Mk I) is a fragmentation hand grenade used by American forces during World War I. According to its designers, it was to be the "simplest", yet most "fool-proof", grenade ever made. However, some major problems appeared when the grenade was used in the field. it was retired from service before the war ended, replaced in 1918 with the improved Mk 2 grenade used through World War II.

Overview
The MK 1 is a time-fused fragmentation grenade and has 32 serrations on it. To start the fuse, the user has to pull the safety pin, then push off the cap on top of the grenade. Right before throwing, the user has to move the switch on the lever away from the grenade in order to start the fuse.

History
When American forces entered World War I, they lacked a fragmentation grenade of their own. American forces often received either the Mills bomb or the French F1 grenade. When it came time to make a grenade, American designers looked to the F1 grenade for inspiration. In 1917, the Mk 1 grenade was created.

However, it became apparent that the Mk 1 grenade was quite difficult to use in the field. The grenades were often not ignited properly before being thrown, and enemies would return the grenade, this time properly lit. The MK 1 was immediately recalled and production stopped. It was replaced in 1918 with the improved Mk 2 grenade used through World War II.

Variants

Mk. IA1
The Mk. IA1 was an inert cast-iron training grenade. It has a simulated fuze with a removable pin and safety lever. They were manufactured for a brief time during World War I to train troops on how to initiate and throw the Mk. I and Mk. II fragmentation grenades. Early in the United States’ entry into World War II, a number were produced as training aids in 1942.

Its markings consist of a black body with a narrow white band around the top.

References

External links
 More Mk 1 grenade pictures and a picture of the training model

World War I infantry weapons of the United States
Hand grenades of the United States
Fragmentation grenades
Weapons of the Philippine Army